Kuhgir-e Olya (also Romanized as Kūhgīr-e ‘Olyā, Gūgīr-e ‘Olyā, and Kūgīr-e ‘Olyā; also known as Kowgīr Larvand, Larvand, and Qeshlāq-e Larvand) is a village in Kuhgir Rural District, Tarom Sofla District, Qazvin County, Qazvin Province, Iran. At the 2006 census, its population was 154, in 46 families.

References 

Populated places in Qazvin County